The Samsung Galaxy SmartTag is a key finder and object finder produced by Samsung Electronics. The device utilizes Bluetooth LE to allow the user to locate whatever object it is attached to via the SmartThings mobile app. The device was announced at Samsung's Galaxy Unpacked event on January 14, 2021.

Function 
The Galaxy SmartTag is a tracking device which can be attached to various objects that are easily lost with a small strap (sold separately) or by other means, such as a keychain. Objects include keys, luggage, purses, among others. The device can then be located with SmartThings mobile app, using Bluetooth LE. Another variant, the Galaxy SmartTag+, uses ultra-wideband technology in order to locate the device and was released in April 2021. Only limited phones, that are more recently produced, manufactured by Samsung supports such features. While the device is inside of the Bluetooth range (120 meters), it can play a ringtone using its inbuilt Piezoelectric speaker to alert the user of its exact location audibly, using a volume between 85 - 96 dB (unobstructed). If the device is outside of the Bluetooth LE range, the device can still be located using Samsung's SmartThings Find Network, which uses the internet connection and GPS location of other Samsung Galaxy phones in the area to anonymously pinpoint the location of the SmartTag to the owner. The device also has a programmable button that can be used to control SmartThings-compatible smart-home products.

Use in a criminal context 
Tracking devices similar to the SmartTag have been implicated in criminal activity, such as stalking and identifying when properties are empty. The SmartThings app offers to notify a user if it detects a SmartTag moving with them for a prolonged amount of time when not in range of the owner. The SmartTag offers for the battery to be removed to stop the device from functioning, if found in such situations. In such circumstances, victims are advised to hand the SmartTag to their local Police station for investigation.

See also 
Tile (company)
TrackR
AirTag

References

External links 

 Official website

Samsung Galaxy
Internet object tracking